New York City's 17th City Council district is one of 51 districts in the New York City Council. It has been represented by Democrat Rafael Salamanca since a 2016 special election to succeed fellow Democrat Maria del Carmen Arroyo.

Geography
District 17 covers a series of neighborhoods at the heart of the South Bronx, including some or all of Crotona Park East, Melrose, Hunts Point, Concourse, East Tremont, Morrisania, Longwood, Port Morris, and West Farms. Crotona Park, North and South Brother Islands, and The Hub are all located within the district.

The district overlaps with Bronx Community Boards 1, 2, 3, 4, 6, and 9, and is contained entirely within New York's 15th congressional district. It also overlaps with the 29th, 32nd, 33rd, and 34th districts of the New York State Senate, and with the 77th, 79th, 84th, 85th, 86th, and 87th districts of the New York State Assembly.

Recent election results

2021

In 2019, voters in New York City approved Ballot Question 1, which implemented ranked-choice voting in all local elections. Under the new system, voters have the option to rank up to five candidates for every local office. Voters whose first-choice candidates fare poorly will have their votes redistributed to other candidates in their ranking until one candidate surpasses the 50 percent threshold. If one candidate surpasses 50 percent in first-choice votes, then ranked-choice tabulations will not occur.

2017

2016 special
In late 2015, Councilwoman Maria del Carmen Arroyo announced she would resign, triggering a February 2016 special election for her seat. Like most municipal special elections in New York City, the race was officially nonpartisan, with all candidates running on ballot lines of their own creation.

2013

References

New York City Council districts